Shuttle is a 2008 thriller film about a group of young travelers who are kidnapped by an airport shuttle driver with unknown motives. The film was written and directed by Edward Anderson, and stars Tony Curran, Peyton List, and Cameron Goodman.

Shuttle premiered at South by Southwest on March 8, 2008 in Austin, Texas. The film opened theatrically in limited release in the United States on March 6, 2009.

Plot
Mel (Peyton List) and Jules (Cameron Goodman) are best friends returning to Los Angeles from a trip in Mexico. Seth (James Snyder) and Matt (Dave Power) arrive and introduce themselves to them. Jules takes Mel into the bathroom to help her deal with her motion sickness, where Mel tells her that she has broken up with her fiancé.

Mel's luggage is lost in the airport, so she must return the next day to get it. Outside, they board a shuttle bus after its Driver (Tony Curran) offers to charge them half the price of a regular shuttle. On board, they meet Andy (Cullen Douglas), a shy family man. Seth and Matt see them and attempt to board, but the Driver tells them he can only make three stops at a time. Jules informs him that the men are with them.

During the trip, Mel shows Matt her signing skills while Seth and Jules flirt with each other. While taking an unusual detour, they are run off the road by a car, and the Driver gets out to survey the damage, which turns out to be a flat tire. Jules opts to call a taxi, but there is no service where they are. Matt offers to help change the tire. While his hand is on top of the tire, the Driver looks for some nuts for the wheel. Suddenly, the bus falls off the jack and onto Matt's hand, severing his fingers. They quickly drive off to the hospital.

During the ride, the Driver calmly pulls over, much to the astonishment of the passengers. He pulls a gun on them and demands cooperation, taking everyone's phones and wallets. While Mel and Seth argue about doing something, Jules finds a flare under the seat from the safety kit used to bandage Matt's hand, and Mel comes up with a plan to get the window open. Andy sees her and causes a commotion. A struggle ensues and the flare is set ablaze. The Driver sees this, stops the bus and removes the flare. Jules runs for the front and finds the door locked and the key missing.

The Driver re-enters and slashes Seth's face with a switchblade as a warning to the others. He informs them of a "change of plans", and drives them to an enclosed ATM for Jules to withdraw money. While she is inside, she knocks some paper into a bin and sets it on fire to set off an alarm. The Driver sees this and rushes towards her, but she slams the door. Mel escapes, but the Driver shouts at her that he will let Jules suffocate from smoke inhalation if she doesn't return to the bus.

At a supermarket, Mel signs into the closed-circuit camera her plight and gives the clerk a note to check the recording. Seth gets free, makes a run for it and is run over by the bus. His body is put on the bus. The clerk finds that the cctv was never turned on. Later, Mel shows Matt a knife she hid in the ice, which she uses to cut their belts off. Matt uses the ice bag to smash the window, and they all shout for help. When the driver walks towards them with a gun, Mel cuts the guy's wrist with the knife, and Matt hits him over the head with the bag. Mel grabs the gun and threatens to shoot the Driver. She makes him hand over the keys to the belts, and Jules is able to get herself and Andy free.

She takes the wheel of the bus and drives, leaving Matt with the gun and Andy with the knife. Andy then nonchalantly stabs Matt in the throat, which no one notices at first. He grabs the gun and puts it to Mel's head, telling her to get away from the pedals. Andy then reveals himself to be in league with the Driver. They stop at a bridge to throw the boys' bodies off, and afterward, Andy torments the girls for a few minutes before the Driver gets him to stop.

Mel get a tire iron from under the seat, and keeps it by her side. Andy wraps tape around the girls' mouths and takes a cuff of their hair. Mel hits him several times with the tire iron and the Driver is forced to stop. She pulls herself free, and the Driver attempts to get the gun, only for her to hit him on the hand, and knock it towards Jules. Mel seizes control and drives away, but he rushes towards her. She slams the brakes and accelerates to throw him about. She reaches for a knife and stabs him in the knee. Andy comes over to attack her but she grabs a fire extinguisher and hits him with it. The bus then crashes into a wall during the struggle.

Jules finds Andy dead and the driver and Mel unconscious; he flags down a passing car but while dialing 911 the bus runs over him. The Driver then takes them to a warehouse, where he forcibly removes a tattoo from Jules' body; he also takes the girls' driving licences and puts them in a drawer which is already full of other IDs of people the Driver has kidnapped or murdered before.  He has Jules dye Mel's hair blonde, then makes Mel and Jules strip down to their underwear and wear white high heels for an inspection. The man who inspects them is revealed to be the man that ran them off the road earlier, and the same man who was seen observing them at the airport in the opening scene. The Driver inspects their bags and finds that Jules has antifungal medication for a yeast infection. Since Jules is of no use to the Driver since both girls must be in good health, he takes her onto the bus and gasses her with a tube connected to the exhaust.

He finds Mel, who threatens to cut her face with a shard of glass, which would make her useless to him as well. Instead, she stabs him in the arm with it. He attempts to disarm her, but she stabs it into his thigh before hitting him in the face with some light fixtures. She finds the gun and shoots him, the bullet skimming his head. Thinking he is dead, she tries to escape in the bus. However, before it can start, the Driver attacks her again. They grapple for a minute before he forces her into a large wooden crate, which contains the items Mel purchased earlier in the grocery store: a flashlight, a loaf of bread, two jugs of water, two magazines, kitty litter, and a litter box, as well as her motion sickness pills.

Trapped inside the dark crate, Mel yells for help, but no one is there, and when someone with a forklift comes, he turns out to be in on the operation. While being carried away, she finds a photo of seven young white women in what looks like a filthy underground cellar. The photo depicts the despondent-looking girls completely naked, hair dyed blonde, and wearing white high heels (like Mel and Jules were forced to wear). It is heavily implied that these girls were also kidnapped by the Driver at some point and forced to become sex slaves overseas. Mel looks at the photo in horror as she realizes that she is to become a sex slave too. The crate is then loaded onto a cargo ship destined for East Asia.

The final shot is of Mel's lost luggage turning up at the airport as another day begins.

Critical reception
The film received mixed reviews from critics. The review aggregator Rotten Tomatoes reports that 52% of critics gave the film a positive review, based on 23 reviews. The consensus says, "While this debut by Edward Anderson is economical and occasionally effective, Shuttle offers little catharsis after its tense ride."

References

External links
 
 
 

2008 films
2008 directorial debut films
2008 thriller films
2000s English-language films
American thriller films
Films about human trafficking
Films about kidnapping in the United States
Films shot in Massachusetts
Magnolia Pictures films
Works about sex trafficking
2000s American films